Love & Peace is a Cantopop album by Edmond Leung.

Track listing
Homemade Instant Noodles (住家丁麵)
Joyful (痛快)
First Lady (第一夫人)
External Stuff (身外物)
Impatient (躁)
Requiem (安魂戰曲)
The Best Love (最愛)

Music awards

References

Edmond Leung albums
2009 EPs